Beth Campbell may refer to:
Beth Campbell (artist) (born 1971), American artist
Beth Campbell (musician) in Atlas (band)
Beth Campbell (jurist), magistrate of the Australian Capital Territory
Beth Newlands Campbell, president of Rexall Drugstore

See also
Bethany Campbell, writer
Elizabeth Campbell (disambiguation)